Ananthacorus is a genus of ferns in the subfamily Vittarioideae of the family Pteridaceae with a single species Ananthacorus angustifolius. Its native distribution ranges from Mexico through Central America to northern South America. It has been introduced into parts of Malesia.

References

Pteridaceae
Monotypic fern genera